JCSAT-11, was a geostationary communications satellite ordered by JSAT Corporation (now SKY Perfect JSAT Group) which was designed and manufactured by Lockheed Martin on the A2100 platform. The satellite was designated to be used as an on-orbit, but was lost on launch failure.

Satellite description
The spacecraft was designed and manufactured by Lockheed Martin on the A2100AX satellite bus. A near copy of JCSAT-3A, it was to be used as an on orbit spare. As most satellites based on the A2100 platform, it uses a  LEROS-1C LAE for orbit raising.

Its payload is composed of eighteen 27 MHz and twelve 36 MHz Ku band plus twelve C band transponders, for a total bandwidth of 1,350 MHz. Its high-power amplifiers had an output power of 127 Watts on Ku band and 48 Watts on C band.

History
On October 3, 2005, JSAT ordered an A2100AX based satellite from Lockheed Martin, JCSAT-11. It would be an almost copy of JCSAT-3A, with a C band and Ku band payload. It was expected to be launched in 2007 to act as a backup for the whole JSAT fleet.

The almost 19-year streak of successful JCSAT launches was ended when a Proton-M/Briz-M failed to orbit JCSAT-11 on September 5, 2007. A damaged pyro firing cable on the interstage truss prevented the second stage from controlling its direction, and the rocket and its payload crashed into the Kazakhstan steppes. Being lucky in misfortune, JCSAT-11 was simply an on-orbit backup and thus it had no operational impact on the fleet.

The same day of the launch failure, JSAT placed an order with Lockheed for an identical replacement, JCSAT-12, for launch in 2009. On September 19, 2007, they closed a deal with Arianespace for a launch slot with an Ariane 5 for its launch.

References

Communications satellites in geostationary orbit
Satellites using the A2100 bus
Spacecraft launched in 2007
Communications satellites of Japan
Satellites of Japan